NGC 645 is a barred spiral galaxy in the constellation Pisces. It is estimated to be 112 million light-years from the Milky Way and has a diameter of approximately 115,000 light years. The object was discovered on October 27, 1864 by astronomer Albert Marth.

See also 
 List of NGC objects (1–1000)

References

External links 
 

0645
Barred spiral galaxies
Pisces (constellation)
006172